Pietro Colonna Galatino (1460 – 1540), also known as Petrus Galatinus, was an Italian Friar Minor, philosopher, theologian and Orientalist.

Biography 
Galatino was born at Galatina, in Apulia. He received the habit as early as 1480, studied Oriental languages in Rome and was appointed lector at the convent of Ara Coeli; he also held the office of provincial in the province of Bari, and that of penitentiary under Leo X.

Galatino wrote his chief work De Arcanis Catholicae Veritatis, at the request of the pope, the emperor, and other dignitaries, in 1516, at which time, owing mainly to John Reuchlin's Augenspiegel, the famous controversy on the authority of the Jewish writings was assuming a very high-profile. Galatino took up Reuchlin's defence. Resolved to combat the Jews on their own ground, he turned the Cabbala against them, and sought to convince them that their own books yielded proof of the truth of the Christian religion, hence their opposition to it should be branded as obstinacy. Galatino is sometimes referred to as the "inventor" of the Latinized term and pronunciation Jehovah, by blending the Tetragrammaton "YHWH" with the vowels of "Adonai,". He gave his work the form of a dialogue. The two conflicting Christian parties were represented by Capnio (Reuchlin) and the Inquisitor Jacob van Hoogstraaten, O.P. In conciliatory terms, Galatino responded to the queries and suggestions of the former, and refuted the objections of the latter. He had borrowed largely from the Pugio Fidei of the Dominican Raymond Martini, remodelling, however, the material and supplementing it with copious quotations from the Zohar and the Iggeret ha-sodot of the Jewish convert Pablo de Heredia.

In a long letter to Paul III (MS. Vat. Libr., cod. Ottob. Lat. 2366, fol. 300-308) he vehemently defended himself and his party against the charge of having forged the last-named book, which he firmly held to be the work of Rabbenu ha-Kadosh. Galatino was aware, no less than his critics, that his De Arcanis had many shortcomings, both in matter and form, and he begged his readers to consider that he was compelled to finish it within the space of a year and a half. The work became very popular and ran through several editions.

For the rest, Galatino's extensive knowledge and his thorough acquaintance with Greek, Hebrew, and Jewish Aramaic is fully borne out by his numerous other unpublished writings. In bold language he inveighs (or strongly protests) against the corruption among the clergy and discusses the question of reform. While engaged on his remarkable work De Vera Theologia his strength threatened to fail him by reason of his great age and infirmity, but, having taken a vow to defend in the course of this work the doctrine of the Immaculate Conception of the Blessed Virgin, he instantly, so he tells us, recovered his strength and health (MSS. 52, 54, 60, St. Isidore's Coll.).

In 1539, Paul III, in a special Bull, bequeathed Galatino's works, about thirty in number, to the convent of Ara Coeli and enjoined that special care be taken of them. The manuscripts are now preserved in various Roman archives.

Galatino died in Rome. His grandnephew was Lorenzo Mongiò (1550–1630), bishop in Minervino, Auxiliary bishop in Salzburg and Valencia, archbishop in Lanciano and Pozzuoli.

References
Arduinus Kleinhans, De vita et operibus P. Galatini OFM, Antonianum, 1 (1926), 145-179, 327-356
Saverio Campanini, Le prefazioni, le dediche e i colophon di Gershom Soncino, in Giuliano Tamani (ed.), L’attività editoriale di Gershom Soncino. 1502-1527, Soncino 1997, pp. 31–58.
Saverio Campanini, Quasi post vindemias racemos colligens. Pietro Galatino und seine Verteidigung der christlichen Kabbala, in Wilhelm Kühlmann (Hrsg.), Reuchlins Freunde und Gegner. Kommunikative Konstellationen eines frühneuzeitlichen Medienereignisses, «Pforzheimer Reuchlinschriften» 12, Jan Thorbecke Verlag, Ostfildern 2010, pp. 69–88.
 Christoph Brandhuber, Oliver Ruggenthaler, Zwischen Sonnenstaat und Geistergrotte. Der Franziskaner Lorenzo Mongiò - ein Ikonograph für Salzburg?, in Roswitha Juffinger (ed.), Zentrum der Macht. Die Kunstsammlungen der Salzburger Fürsterzbischöfe: Gemälde / Graphik / Kunstgewerbe, Salzburg 2011, pp. 496–509.
Sharon Leftley, Beyond Joachim of Fiore: Pietro Galatino's Commentaria in Apocalypsim, Franciscan Studies 55 (1998), 137-167
Petrus Galatinus (Pietro Colonna Galatino/Monggius/Mongio/Colombo, c. 1460/1465, Galatina (Apulia) - 1540, Rome) - FRANCISCAN AUTHORS, 13TH - 18TH CENTURY: A CATALOGUE IN PROGRESS

External links
De arcanis catholicae veritatis, a digitized copy of the first edition (Ortona a Mare 1518) online here
Oratio de circumcisione dominica, a digitized copy of the edition Rome 1515 online here

Attribution

1460 births
1540 deaths
People from the Province of Lecce
15th-century Italian Roman Catholic theologians
Christian Hebraists
Christian Kabbalists
16th-century Italian Roman Catholic theologians